Jude Ikechukwu Nworuh (born 9 June 1989 in Lagos) is a Nigerian professional footballer who is currently playing for Hapoel Ramat Gan.

Career
Nworuh began his career at F.C. Ebedei in Lagos, Nigeria, which is the former youth team of Obafemi Martins and many other successful Nigerian footballers. He was a top scorer at F.C. Ebedei, which led to a move to the Danish Club, Midtjylland, who at the time were scouting heavily in Nigeria.

On 20 September 2008 he was injured during a match, resulting in a skull fracture. He was operated later that night in Aarhus, and made a full recovery.

He played his first UEFA Cup game in 2008, and featured again in the UEFA Europa League (name change) in 2011.

He was loaned out to Fredericia to get more playing time and then on 4 September 2012 he signed a contract with AC Horsens. He has been a consistent scorer for AC Horsens, and has been their highest goalscorer every season after his first season with them.

On 7 September 2017, Nworuh signed with Indian Super League franchise Chennaiyin FC. He made 11 appearances, with his team winning the league. On 4 June 2018, it was announced that he was released by the club.

Honours

Club

Chennaiyin FC
 Indian Super League: 2017–18

References

External links

1989 births
Living people
Nigerian footballers
F.C. Ebedei players
FC Midtjylland players
AC Horsens players
Bnei Yehuda Tel Aviv F.C. players
Bnei Sakhnin F.C. players
FC Ilves players
Chennaiyin FC players
Hapoel Marmorek F.C. players
Hapoel Ramat Gan F.C. players
Danish Superliga players
Israeli Premier League players
Veikkausliiga players
Indian Super League players
Liga Leumit players
Nigerian expatriate footballers
Expatriate men's footballers in Denmark
Nigerian expatriate sportspeople in Denmark
Expatriate footballers in Israel
Nigerian expatriate sportspeople in Israel
Expatriate footballers in Finland
Nigerian expatriate sportspeople in Finland
Association football forwards
Sportspeople from Lagos